The Xiaowan Dam is an arch dam on the Lancang (Mekong) River in Nanjian County, Yunnan Province in southwest China. The primary purpose of the dam is hydroelectric power generation and it supports a 4,200 MW power station. It is also third highest among dams of all types behind Jinping-I and Nurek and the third largest hydroelectric power station in China.

Background
The feasibility study for the dam was completed in 1992, with it as part of the Lancang River Project. In 1995 the report was reviewed and approved by the Chinese government. Three years later in 1998, a consortium to fund and construct the dam was organized. In 1999, preliminary construction (roads, bridges, river diversion) began. Official construction on the dam started on 1 January 2002. The river was diverted by November 2003 and concrete pouring began in 2005. The river diversion was closed and the reservoir began to impound in November 2007. The first generator was commissioned in September 2009 and the dam was complete in March 2010. The last of the six generators went operational on 22 August 2010. The creation of the dam's reservoir submerged  of land and displaced 32,737 people.

Specifications 
The dam traps water from a catchment area covering .

Helping to control floods, the dam has two spillways, 5 gates near the crest and a tunnel on the left bank. In the middle portion of the dam, there are six orifice openings that can discharge . In addition, the dam can release additional water and sediment with two bottom outlets.

On the right bank of the dam is the power station intake which receives water into six  diameter penstocks which each feed a 700 MW Francis turbine-turbine in the underground power station. Once discharged by the turbine, the water is sent down one of two  diameter tailrace tunnels towards the river.

See also 

List of power stations in China
 List of tallest dams in the world
 List of tallest dams in China
 List of dams and reservoirs in China

References 

Hydroelectric power stations in Yunnan
Dams in the Mekong River Basin
Dams in China
Arch dams
Dams completed in 2010
Underground power stations
2010 establishments in China
Energy infrastructure completed in 2010
Buildings and structures in Dali Bai Autonomous Prefecture
Buildings and structures in Lincang